John Edward Flowers (born 26 August 1944) is an English former footballer who played as a midfielder for Stoke City, Doncaster Rovers, Port Vale, and Eastwood in the 1960s and 1970s. He scored four goals in 206 league games in a nine-year career in the Football League, with the bulk of these appearances coming at Doncaster, where he won the Fourth Division title in 1968–69. He is the younger brother of Ron Flowers, and the nephew of George Flowers.

Career
Flowers was born in Edlington into a sporting family and he followed in their footsteps joining Stoke City in 1963. He spent most of his time at the Victoria Ground in the reserves and after making just nine first team appearances in three seasons he was sold to Third Division Doncaster Rovers for £10,000. In his first season at Belle Vue the newly promoted "Donny" suffered relegation back into the Fourth Division. They finished 10th in 1967–68 before winning the title in 1968–69 under the stewardship of Lawrie McMenemy. Flowers was an ever-present in 1969–70 playing in all of Rovers' 52 fixtures. He played 33 times in 1970–71 as Doncaster were again relegated to the Fourth Division. Flowers scored four goals in 186 first team games in his five years at Belle Vue. He was signed by Port Vale manager Gordon Lee for a "small fee" in August 1971. He played 37 league and cup games in the 1971–72 season but was handed a free transfer away from Vale Park in May 1972 on account of his "mixed form"; apparently this inconsistency was caused by his other job as a pub licensee. He moved on to non-league Eastwood.

Personal life
He is the younger brother of Ron Flowers who played for England. His uncle was George Flowers who also played for Doncaster Rovers. He was married to Maureen Flowers, a former world champion of darts.

Career statistics
Source:

Honours
Doncaster Rovers 
 Fourth Division: 1968–69

References

1944 births
Living people
People from Edlington
Footballers from Doncaster
English footballers
Association football midfielders
Stoke City F.C. players
Doncaster Rovers F.C. players
Port Vale F.C. players
Eastwood Hanley F.C. players
English Football League players